Cosmopterix flava is a moth in the family Cosmopterigidae. It was described by Sinev in 1986.

References

Natural History Museum Lepidoptera generic names catalog

Moths described in 1986
flava